Trachymene is a   genus of herbaceous plants in the family Araliaceae. The species are native to Australia, Malesia, New Caledonia and Fiji.

Species include:
Trachymene anisocarpa (Turcz.) 
Trachymene bialata  (Domin) B.L.Burtt  
Trachymene bivestita  (Domin) L.A.S.Johnson 
Trachymene ceratocarpa  (W. Fitzg.) Keighery & Rye 
Trachymene clivicola  Boyland & A.E.Holland 
Trachymene coerulea  Graham - Blue lace flower
Trachymene composita  (Domin) B.L.Burtt 
Trachymene croniniana  (F.Muell.) T.Durand & B.D.Jacks. 
Trachymene cussonii  (Montrouz.) B.L.Burtt 
Trachymene cyanantha  Boyland 
Trachymene cyanopetala  (F.Muell.) Benth. - Purple parsnip
Trachymene dendrothrix  Maconochie 
Trachymene didiscoides  (F.Muell.) B.L.Burtt 
Trachymene dusenii  (Domin) F.M.Bailey 
Trachymene elachocarpa  (F.Muell.) B.L.Burtt 
Trachymene geraniifolia  F.M.Bailey
Trachymene gilleniae  (Tate) B.L.Burtt 
Trachymene glandulosa  (F.Muell.) Benth. 
Trachymene glaucifolia  (F.Muell.) Benth. - Wild parsnip or wild carrot
Trachymene grandis  (Turcz.) Rye 
Trachymene hookeri  (Domin) A.E.Holland 
Trachymene humilis  (Hook.f.) Benth.
Trachymene incisa  Rudge - Wild parsnip
Trachymene inflata  Maconochie 
Trachymene longipedunculata  Maconochie 
Trachymene microcephala  (Domin) B.L.Burtt 
Trachymene ochracea  L.A.S.Johnson - White parsnip or wild parsnip
Trachymene oleracea  (Domin) B.L.Burtt
Trachymene ornata  (Endl.) Druce - Sponge-fruit 
Trachymene pilbarensis  Rye 
Trachymene pilosa  Sm. - Native parsnip
Trachymene pimpinellifolia  (Domin) B.L.Burtt 
Trachymene procumbens  (F.Muell.) Benth.  
Trachymene psammophila Maconochie 
Trachymene pyrophila  Rye 
Trachymene rotundifolia  (Benth.) Maconochie 
Trachymene scapigera  (Domin) B.L.Burtt 
Trachymene setosa  (O.Schwarz) B.L.Burtt 
Trachymene tenuifolia  (Domin) B.L.Burtt 
Trachymene thysanocarpa  J.M.Hart 
Trachymene umbratica  J.M. Hart 
Trachymene villosa  (F.Muell.) Benth.

References

External links

 
Taxa named by Edward Rudge
Plants described in 1811
Apiales genera